Mark Tookey (born 9 March 1977) is an Australian former professional rugby league footballer who played in the 1990 and 2000s. Tookey then played in the Super League for the Castleford Tigers (Heritage № 817) and the Harlequins RL.

Background
Tookey was born in Paddington, New South Wales and raised in Brisbane, Queensland, playing his junior rugby league for Logan Brothers and Springwood Tigers. In 1994, he represented the Queensland under-17 side.

Playing career
Tookey commenced his premiership playing career with the South Queensland Crushers debuting during the 1996 ARL season. That season he represented the Queensland under-19 side. He then moved to the Parramatta Eels and later joined the Auckland Warriors. He played for the Warriors at prop forward in their 2002 NRL Grand Final loss to the Sydney Roosters.

In 2004 Tookey started playing in the Super League for English club the Castleford Tigers, later moving to the London Broncos/Harlequins RL.

Post-playing
Following to his retirement as a player, Tookey was in 2009 the assistant coach of the Tongan side.  He later worked as a Development Officer for the Canberra Raiders with their associated club Souths Logan Magpies.

Tookey ran as an independent candidate in Division 5 in the 2016 Logan City Council election, which was being held on 19 March.

In November 2018, Tookey played for Parramatta in the Legends of League tournament held in Gosford. The side was captained by Nathan Hindmarsh and made it to the preliminary final before being defeated by The Barbarians.

In November 2019, Tookey played for Parramatta in the Legends of League Tournament, held in Broadmeadow, NSW. The side was captained by Nathan Hindmarsh, they made it to the grand final, and beating the Canterbury Team in the Final.

References

Sources

External links

Mark Tookey at NRL Stats

1977 births
Living people
Australian rugby league players
Castleford Tigers players
London Broncos players
Manurewa Marlins players
New Zealand Warriors players
Parramatta Eels players
Rugby league players from Sydney
Rugby league props
South Queensland Crushers players